Zamuxolo Joseph Peter (10 January 1965 – 31 July 2020) was a South African politician who served as a Member of the National Assembly from May 2019 until his death in July 2020. He was the mayor of the Makana Local Municipality from 2011 until 2015. Peter was a member of the African National Congress.

Early life and career
Zamuxolo Joseph Peter was born on 10 January 1965 in Riebeeck East, north of Grahamstown. He had to leave school after his father, a farm labourer, died. He attended Border Technikon and studied at the Beit Berl College in Israel.

Peter was a member of the United Democratic Front. Within the African National Congress, he served as a regional chairperson and a member of the provincial executive committee.

After the 1995 municipal election,  Peter was elected mayor of the Riebeeck East Transitional Council. He was elected as a ward councillor of the newly established Makana Local Municipality in the 2000 municipal election. Peter was elected mayor of Makana in 2011 and held the position until 2015.

Parliamentary career
Peter was placed 13th on the ANC's regional list for the 2019 general election. After the election, he was nominated to Parliament. He was sworn in as a Member of Parliament on 22 May 2019.

Committee memberships
Portfolio Committee on Tourism
Standing Committee on Auditor-General

Death
On 11 July 2020, Peter was admitted to a hospital after testing positive for COVID-19 during the COVID-19 pandemic in South Africa. He died on 31 July. He was 55 years old. Peter is survived by his wife and three children.

References

External links
 Zamuxolo Joseph Peter – People's Assembly

1965 births
2020 deaths
People from the Eastern Cape
African National Congress politicians
Members of the National Assembly of South Africa
Xhosa people
Deaths from the COVID-19 pandemic in South Africa